Royal North Devon Golf Club, commonly abbreviated as RND, was founded in 1864, and is the oldest golf course in England. The course was designed by Scottish golfer Old Tom Morris.

Geography
RND is located on Northam Burrows between Northam and Westward Ho! Northam Burrows is common land and was notified as a Site of Special Scientific Interest in 1988. Golfers share the environment with sheep, ponies and walkers. In January 2018 part of the seventh green was washed away during Storm Eleanor and there is disagreement between the golf club and Natural England on the management of the coast. There are no plans by Natural England to build coast defences here and point out that the golf club can build two new greens elsewhere and relinquish two existing greens.

History
Three leading British golfers of the late 19th and early 20th were known as the Great Triumvirate. One of them, J.H. Taylor, learned his golf at RND and was invested Honorary President of the Club in 1957. RND was also the home course for the noted amateur golfer Horace Hutchinson, who won the British Amateur in 1886 and 1887. The course has hosted The Amateur Championship on three occasions, in 1912, 1925, and 1931. The Club provides facilities for one of the largest Junior Sections in the country.

Conservation 
The club was the first to ban plastic tees over fears that they were being eaten by wildlife.

See also
List of golf clubs granted Royal status

References

External links
 Official site

1864 establishments in England
Golf clubs and courses in Devon
Organisations based in the United Kingdom with royal patronage
Sports clubs established in 1864
Royal golf clubs